Klein may refer to:

People
Klein (surname)
Klein (musician)

Places
Klein (crater), a lunar feature
Klein, Montana, United States
Klein, Texas, United States
Klein (Ohm), a river of Hesse, Germany, tributary of the Ohm
Klein River, a river in the Western Cape province of South Africa

Business
Klein Bikes, a bicycle manufacturer
Klein Tools, a manufacturer
S. Klein, a department store
Klein Modellbahn, an Austrian model railway manufacturer

Arts
Klein + M.B.O., an Italian musical group
Klein Award, for comic art
Yves Klein, French artist

Mathematics
Klein bottle, an unusual shape in topology
Klein geometry
Klein configuration, in geometry
Klein cubic (disambiguation)
Klein graphs, in graph theory
Klein model, or Beltrami–Klein model, a model of hyperbolic geometry
Klein polyhedron, a generalization of continued fractions to higher dimensions, in the geometry of numbers
Klein surface, a dianalytic manifold of complex dimension 1

Other uses
 Kleins, Lineman's pliers, a hand tool used by electricians and others
 Klein Technique, a movement/dance technique developed by Susan Klein and studied by Garry Stewart

See also
Kleine, a surname
Kline (disambiguation)
Cline (disambiguation)